Jessie Hodges (born 19 October 1996) is a New Zealand cyclist. She competed at the 2020 Summer Olympics, and is a multiple national champion.

Career 
From Waikato and previously a netball player, Hodges suffered a torn anterior cruciate ligament and needed a year away from competition. Riding a bike for rehabilitation and recovery she found herself enjoying the sport. By 2016 she was competing in the national criterium championships in New Zealand but did not finish.

She won National Championship gold in the Madison, Points race and Individual pursuit titles in 2018, and defended the Madison title in 2019 and added the team pursuit as well that year. The 2019–2020 season saw Hodges claim a maiden Oceania title in the team pursuit, along with silver medals in the Madison and Points Race. She won World Cup gold in the team pursuit in Hong Kong along with medals in the Madison in Hong Kong and Cambridge.

Hodges was named in the New Zealand team for the delayed 2020 Summer Games. Hodges competed in the two-rider Madison with Rushlee Buchanan, finishing eleventh. She was a reserve for both the Omnium and team pursuit. In 2021 Hodges was runner-up in the New Zealand national championship Omnium event behind Ally Wollaston.

References

1996 births
Living people
New Zealand track cyclists
New Zealand female cyclists
Cyclists at the 2020 Summer Olympics
Olympic cyclists of New Zealand
21st-century New Zealand women